The M.Zuiko Digital ED 14–150 mm f/4.0-5.6 MSC is a Micro Four Thirds System lens by Olympus Corporation. It is sold as a standalone item, and also offered as a kit with any Olympus PEN camera.

External links 
 Official Webpage
 http://www.four-thirds.org/en/microft/standard.html#i_014-150mm_f040-056_olympus

References

14-150mm F4-5.6
Camera lenses introduced in 2010